Elaphoidella amabilis is a species of copepod in the family Canthocamptidae. Its type locality is Norway.

The IUCN conservation status of Elaphoidella amabilis is "VU", vulnerable. The species faces a high risk of endangerment in the medium term. The IUCN status was reviewed in 1996.

References

Harpacticoida
IUCN Red List vulnerable species
Fauna of the United States
Freshwater crustaceans of North America
Crustaceans described in 1993